

2006 NZIHL Standings

W = Main Round Win = 3 points
L = Main Round Loss
T = Main Round Tie = 2 points
BP = Bonus Point = 1 point

2006 Season Results

Round 1- Avondale

June 9, 2006 - South Auckland Swarm 5 v Canterbury Red Devils 4

June 10, 2006 - West Auckland Admirals 5 v Canterbury Red Devils 3

June 11, 2006 - South Auckland Swarm 3 v West Auckland Admirals 2

Round 2 - Queenstown

June 30, 2006 - Southern Stampede 6 v Canterbury Red Devils 4		

July 1, 2006 - Southern Stampede 6 v West Auckland Admirals 3

July 2, 2006 - Canterbury Red Devils 4 v West Auckland Admirals 4 	

Round 3 - Christchurch

July 21, 2006 - Southern Stampede 7 v South Auckland Swarm 2		

July 22, 2006 - Canterbury Red Devils 3 v Southern Stampede 1		

July 23, 2006 - Canterbury Red Devils 4 v South Auckland Swarm 5

Round 4 - Botany Downs

August 11, 2006 - West Auckland Admirals 3 v Southern Stampede 5	

August 12, 2006 - South Auckland Swarm 4 v Southern Stampede 0	

August 13, 2006 - South Auckland Swarm 6 v West Auckland Admirals 0 		
	
Finals - Botany Downs

September 9, 2006 - South Auckland Swarm 3 v Southern Stampede 3

September 10, 2006 - South Auckland Swarm 4 v Southern Stampede 5

2006 NZIHL Champion - Southern Stampede

2006 Leading Scorers

2006 NZIHL Awards
MVP of Canterbury Red Devils - Andreas Ericsson

MVP of South Auckland Swarm - Mike Lawrie

MVP of Southern Stampede - Brett Speirs

MVP of West Auckland Admirals - Jeff Bonazzo

Best Defenceman - BJ Lang - Southern Stampede

Top Goaltender - Greg Davies - West Auckland Admirals

Top Points Scorer - Jeff Bonazzo - West Auckland Admirals

League MVP - Jeff Bonazzo - West Auckland Admirals

Top Rookie - Martin Lee - South Auckland Swarm

Finals MVP -  Loren Nowland - Southern Stampede & Joshua Hay - South Auckland Swarm

New Zealand Ice Hockey League seasons
New Zealand
Ice
New